Henwick is a suburb of Worcester, England.

Henwick may also refer to:
 Henwick railway station, a former station in Henwick, Worcester
 Jessica Henwick (born 1992), English actress